The U.S. Department of Agriculture Office of Inspector General (USDA OIG) is one of the Inspector General offices created by the Inspector General Act of 1978. The Inspector General for the Department of Agriculture is charged with investigating and auditing department programs to combat waste, fraud, and abuse. A component of USDA-OIG, the Office of Investigations, conducts criminal investigations led by USDA-OIG Special Agents.

History of Inspectors General

Notes

References

Agriculture Office of Inspector, Department of
United States Department of Agriculture
United States Department of Agriculture agencies